Sagor från Blåbärsberget ("Tales from the Blueberry Mountain") was the 1978 edition of Sveriges Radio's Christmas Calendar.

Plot
This year, the programme consisted of various fairytales from all over the world.

References
 

1978 radio programme debuts
1978 radio programme endings
Sveriges Radio's Christmas Calendar